Sven Bert Jonas Karlsson (born 11 March 1971) is a Swedish actor and author.

Karlsson was born in Salem. He won a Guldbagge Award for Best Actor in 2004 for the movie Details. He published his first book, a collection of short stories, in 2007. He wrote three short novels that were translated into English: The Room, The Invoice, and The Circus. His writing often features weird characters and Kafkaesque surrealism.

Selected filmography
Rasmus på luffen (1981)
Sökarna (1993)
Tsatsiki, morsan och polisen (1999)
Once in a Lifetime (2000)
Tsatsiki – vänner för alltid (2001)
Making Babies (2001)
Details (2003)
Strings (2004)
Storm (2005)
Bang Bang Orangutang (2005)
Offside (2006)
Bad Faith - Ond Tro (2010)
Cockpit (2012)
Black Mirror Episode: "Hated in the Nation" (2016)
The Snowman (2017)
Ted – För kärlekens skull (2018)

Bibliography
 Det andra målet (2007)
 Den perfekte vännen : noveller (2009)
 Spår i Snön (2011)
 Spelreglerna (2012)
 God jul : en berättelse (2013)
 Fakturan (2014)

References

External links

1971 births
Living people
Swedish male actors
Best Actor Guldbagge Award winners
People from Södertälje
20th-century Swedish people
21st-century Swedish people